The 1953 New South Wales Rugby Football League season was the forty-sixth season of the rugby league competition based in Sydney. Ten teams from across the city competed for the J. J. Giltinan Shield during the season, which culminated in a final between South Sydney and St. George.

Teams

Ladder

Finals

Final

To win the 1953 premiership St George would need to beat minor premiers Souths in both a final and a Grand final, emulating the feats of the Dragons of 1949 from which team only Noel Pidding was still playing. A crowd of 44,581 were at the Sydney Cricket Ground to see the first phase of this attempt.

Souths opened the scoring with a penalty goal in the ninth minute kicked by Clive Churchill from 40 yards. The Dragons threatened Souths' line continuously in the next stanza but bombed three tries and then lost some momentum in the 14 minutes before half-time during the absence of centre Merv Lees while he was off the field having stitches to his lip after driving a tooth through it. Souths scored 13 points in this period. Ian Moir capitalised on a spillage of the ball by Pidding behind his own line after a heavy tackle, Churchill then featured when he firstly sent Threlfo in and then set up Moir for his second try. The score at half time was 15–0.

Early in the second half Pidding kicked a penalty and a few minutes later Wilson and Gallagher were sent off for fighting. With Wilson gone Rabbitoh hard-men Rayner and Donoghue then took control and four Souths tries flowed to Woolfe, Dougherty, Hammerton and Moir’s third. Two late Dragons’ tries to Brown and Lees made no difference and South Sydney powered to their fourteenth premiership.

South Sydney Rabbitohs 31
Tries: Moir (3), Woolfe, Threlfo, Dougherty, Hammerton
Goals: Dougherty (4), Churchill (1)

St George Dragons 12
Tries: Lees, Brown
Goals: Pidding (3)

Player statistics
The following statistics are as of the conclusion of Round 18.

Top 5 point scorers

Top 5 try scorers

Top 5 goal scorers

References

External links
  The World of Rugby League
 Haddan, Steve [2007] The finals – 100 Years of National Rugby League Finals, Steve Haddan Publishing, Brisbane
 
 
 

New South Wales Rugby League premiership
Nswrfl Season